Colin Bond (born 5 November 1941) is a former Australian rules footballer who played for  in the Victorian Football League (VFL).

Bond made his debut for Fitzroy in Round 6 of the 1961 VFL season, playing two matches in his debut year. He followed up in 1962 with seven matches and 1963 with four matches before becoming more of a regular player in 1964. He played his final VFL match in 1967 having played 54 league matches.

References

1941 births
Living people
Fitzroy Football Club players
Australian rules footballers from Victoria (Australia)